Cassinia complanata, commonly known as smooth cassinia, is a species of flowering plant in the family Asteraceae and is endemic to south-eastern Australia. It is a shrub with sticky, densely hairy stems, narrow linear to cylindrical leaves and heads of small flowers arranged in corymbs.

Description
The heads are arranged in a corymb  in diameter.

Taxonomy
Cassinia complanata was first formally described in 1928 by John McConnell Black in Transactions of the Royal Society of South Australia. The specific epithet (complanata) means "levelled" or "flattened".

Distribution and habitat
This cassinia grows in woodland and mallee in Victoria, from the Big Desert and Little Desert areas to the Grampians, and in south-eastern South Australia .

References

complanata
Asterales of Australia
Flora of Victoria (Australia)
Flora of South Australia
Taxa named by John McConnell Black
Plants described in 1928